MIGOS can refer to:
 Migos, an American hip hop trio founded in 2008.
 Mini GO Solver (MIGOS), a computer program which found a solution to a 5x5 game of Go in 2002.